Walter Whittaker (20 September 1878 – 2 June 1917) was an English football goalkeeper who played in the Football League for Newton Heath, Grimsby Town, Blackburn Rovers, Derby County, Clapton Orient and Swansea Town.

Playing career 
Whittaker began his career with Manchester League side Molyneaux. He had a short spell with Buxton, but returned to Molyneaux before joining Newton Heath in February 1896 as a replacement for William Douglas, who had transferred to Derby County. Whittaker was one of four goalkeepers Newton Heath tried following Douglas' departure (including their regular left-half Walter Cartwright), but the team lost all three matches Whittaker appeared in; he was transferred to Fairfield at the end of the season.

After a season away, Whittaker returned to the Football League with Second Division side Grimsby Town in May 1897, playing in all but two of the club's matches in the 1897–98 season. In May 1898, Whittaker transferred to Southern League club Reading, where he played for almost two seasons before returning to The Football League with Blackburn Rovers in February 1900. After just over 50 league appearances for Blackburn, Whittaker rejoined Grimsby Town – newly promoted to the First Division – in December 1901. The club narrowly avoided relegation at the end of the 1901–02 season, but they were unable to repeat the feat in 1902–03, and at the end of the season, after 47 more appearances for Grimsby, Whittaker transferred to Derby County to remain a First Division player.

Whittaker was predominantly Derby's second-choice goalkeeper in 1903–04, making just 12 league appearances out of a potential 34, before returning to the Southern League with Brentford in May 1904. After two years with Brentford, he moved back to Reading for a season, before returning to the Football League again in 1907 with Second Division side Clapton Orient. After making 90 Football League and six FA Cup appearances in three years with the London side, he made a final return to the Southern League First Division with Exeter City in July 1910.

Management career 
In July 1912, Whittaker was appointed as the first manager of Swansea Town and spent two years with the newly elected Southern League Second Division club in a player-manager capacity. In his first season with Swansea, he won the Welsh Cup and guided the team to third place in the league. After leaving Swansea, he took over as player-manager at nearby Llanelly, but his time there was cut short by the outbreak of the First World War.

Personal life 
Whittaker died of pneumonia in 1917 at the age of 38.

Honours

As a manager 
Swansea Town
 Welsh Cup: 1912–13

References

External links
Profile at StretfordEnd.co.uk
Profile at MUFCInfo.com

1878 births
1917 deaths
English footballers
Manchester United F.C. players
Grimsby Town F.C. players
Reading F.C. players
Blackburn Rovers F.C. players
Derby County F.C. players
Exeter City F.C. players
Swansea City A.F.C. players
Swansea City A.F.C. managers
Buxton F.C. players
Fairfield Athletic F.C. players
Brentford F.C. players
Leyton Orient F.C. players
Llanelli Town A.F.C. players
English Football League players
Southern Football League players
Southern Football League managers
Deaths from pneumonia in Wales
Footballers from Manchester
Association football goalkeepers
English football managers